Chiesa dei Santi Re Magi is a church in Milan, Italy.

Re